Jeremy Camp Live is a live album by musician Jeremy Camp, released on November 17, 2009, and recorded on March 9, 2009, in Dallas, Texas during the Rock And Worship Road Show

Track listing
 Capture Me - 4:53
 Give You Glory - 3:39
 Tonight - 3:44
 This Man - 4:28
 Walk By Faith - 3:18
 Hallelujah/You Never Let Go - 4:46
 Let It Fade - 4:36
 Talking - 5:25
 Speaking Louder Than Before - 3:37
 There Will Be a Day - 5:00
 Take You Back - 4:20
 Take My Life - 4:11
 Lay Down My Pride - 3:45
 Right Here - 5:50
 Give Me Jesus - 7:26

Bonus track from playing the safe minigame on his promotional site for the CD.
 What It Takes (Live from LA) - 3:52

Jeremy Camp albums
BEC Recordings albums
2009 live albums